WHIZ, Whiz or Whizz may refer to:

Arts, entertainment and media
 WHIZ (AM), an American radio station
 WHIZ-FM, an American radio station
 WHIZ-TV, an American TV station
 Whiz Comics, a comic book anthology series 1940–1952 known for Captain Marvel
 WHIZ (comics), a fictional radio station in Captain Marvel stories
 The Whiz, an Amalgam Comics character
 Billy Whizz, a fictional character in The Beano
 Whizz (video game)

Other uses
 Whiz, a slang term for urination
 a slang term for genius 
 Cheez Whiz, a processed cheese sauce
 Whiz, a candy bar sold by the Paul F. Beich Company

See also
 
 Whiz Kids (disambiguation)
 Wiz (disambiguation)
 Wizz (disambiguation)
 Viz (disambiguation)
 Gee Whiz (disambiguation)